Lagosta may refer to:

 Lastovo, Italian name for the Adriatic island
 Lagosta oil field, Brazilian off-shore oil and gas field